Sahibzada Sibghatullah is a Pakistani politician who had been a member of the National Assembly of Pakistan from August 2018 till January 2023.

Political career
He was elected to the National Assembly of Pakistan as a candidate of Pakistan Tehreek-e-Insaf (PTI) from Constituency NA-5 (Upper Dir) in 2018 Pakistani general election. He received 66,545 votes and defeated Najmuddin Khan.

References

Living people
Pakistani MNAs 2018–2023
Pakistan Tehreek-e-Insaf MNAs
Year of birth missing (living people)